Jamie Lawson is the fourth studio album by British singer-songwriter Jamie Lawson. It is also the first album to be released on Ed Sheeran's record label Gingerbread Man Records. On 17 July 2015, it was announced through Lawson's Twitter account that the self-titled album was available for pre-order on iTunes. The release of the album was pushed back by one week to 16 October 2015.

The album debuted at number one on the UK Albums Chart, beating Sheeran's album x to the top spot.

History
In 2014, Lawson received a text from now-successful old acquaintance Ed Sheeran asking for him to open at a secret Dublin show. Sheeran later revealed he used Lawson's 2011 single "Wasn't Expecting That" for inspiration while recording "Afire Love" from his 2014 album x. After joining Sheeran on his 2013 UK and Europe Tour, it was announced that Lawson would be the first signee on Sheeran's newly founded record label Gingerbreadman Records.

Lawson's self-titled album was recorded in 2015, and promoted by a solo tour of Australia and New Zealand. Lawson said Sheeran's involvement with recording the album was minimal, stating he "left me to my own devices to make the record I wanted to make. He put me in touch with a producer who he had been working with and we went through the songs to pick which should be on the album." In the lead-up weeks to the release of the album, Lawson opened for One Direction during their tour of the UK, Ireland and the US.

Singles
 "Wasn't Expecting That" was released as the lead single from the album on 3 April 2015. Originally included on Lawson's 2011 album of the same name, the song was re-released following his signing to Ed Sheeran's newly formed record label, Gingerbread Man Records. It peaked at number 3 on the Australian Singles Chart in 2015.
 "Ahead of Myself" was released as the second single from the album on 7 August 2015. Also generating positive reviews, the song peaked at number 59 on the Australian Singles Chart.
 "Cold in Ohio" was released as the third single from the album in September 2015.
 "Someone for Everyone" was released as the fifth single from the album on 12 May 2016.
 "Don't Let Me Let You Go" was released as the fourth (and final) single from the album on 21 September 2016.

Promotional tour

Track listing

Personnel
Adapted from the album liner notes:
Jamie Lawson – vocals, acoustic guitar, electric guitar, piano on "Cold in Ohio" and "Still Yours"
Henrik Irgens – bass guitar
Matt Racher – drums, percussion
John Tilley – piano, Hammond organ, Mellotron, harmonium, Wurlitzer, glockenspiel
Jack Birchwood – trumpet, flugelhorn, trombone
Nik Carter – saxophone 
Ed Sheeran – backing vocals on "Cold in Ohio" and "Ahead of Myself"
Bailey Tzuke – backing vocals on "The Only Conclusion"
Will Hicks – percussion on "Wasn't Expecting That" and "Cold in Ohio", bass guitar on "Wasn't Expecting That", electric guitar on "Don't Let Me Let You Go"
Fred Abbott – piano on "Wasn't Expecting That"
Bernard Butler – guitar on "Someone for Everyone" and "Ahead of Myself"
Ruadrhi Cushnan – guitar and percussion on "Someone for Everyone", "Cold in Ohio" and "Ahead of Myself"
Josh Watkins, Will Hicks, Louise Astbury, Ania Smarzack, James Hicks – gang vocals on "Ahead of Myself"

Production personnel
Will Hicks – Producer
Oli Barton-Wood - Recording Engineer
Stuart Hawkes – Mastering
Ed Sheeran – A&R
Ed Howard – A&R

Charts and certifications

Weekly charts

Year-end charts

Certifications

Release history

References

2015 albums
Jamie Lawson (musician) albums
Gingerbread Man Records albums